Bal Chandra may refer to:
 Bal Chandra Poudel (born 1961), Nepalese politician
 Bal Chandra Misra, Indian politician